The Koraj massacre was the 28 November 1941 mass murder of over a hundred Bosnian Muslim peasants from the village  near Brčko by Serbian Chetniks. The massacre was in response to the 1941 anti-Communist Tuzla Rebellion.

References

Yugoslavia in World War II
1941 in Bosnia and Herzegovina
November 1941 events
Massacres in 1941
Chetnik war crimes in World War II
Mass murder in 1941
Massacres in Bosnia and Herzegovina
Massacres of Bosniaks
Bosnia and Herzegovina in World War II
1941 murders in Europe